The Lookout is a French-Belgian-Italian crime film from 2012, directed by Michele Placido and starring Daniel Auteuil and Mathieu Kassovitz. It marked Placido's directorial debut outside Italy, as a result of the French box office success of his 2010 film Angel of Evil.

Synopsis 
A Parisian police squad, laying in wait for a group of bank robbers after a tip-off, is attacked by a sniper on a roof top when the robbers come out from the bank. Several policemen are killed and the robbers manage to escape. Chief Inspector Mattei, who led the police squad, tries to identify the sniper and interrogates a possible suspect, while the wounded robbers are treated in the countryside by a corrupt doctor who turns out to be a serial killer.

Main cast
 Daniel Auteuil as Mattei
 Mathieu Kassovitz as Vincent Kaminski
 Olivier Gourmet as Franck
 Francis Renaud as Eric
 Nicolas Briançon as Meyer
 Luca Argentero as Nico
 Violante Placido as Anna
 Arly Jover as Kathy
 Christian Hecq as Gerfaut
 Sébastien Lagniez as Ryan
 Michele Placido as Giovanni
 Fanny Ardant as Giovanni's wife
 Géraldine Martineau as Sonia

References

External links 

2012 crime films
2012 films
Films about bank robbery
Films directed by Michele Placido
French crime films
Italian crime films
2010s French films
2010s French-language films
French-language Belgian films
French-language Italian films